Blue Ridge High School refers to high schools in the following US states:

Blue Ridge High School (Arizona): Pinetop-Lakeside, Arizona
Blue Ridge High School (Illinois): Farmer-City, Illinois
Blue Ridge High School (Texas): Blue Ridge, Texas
Blue Ridge High School (Pennsylvania): New Milford, Pennsylvania
Blue Ridge High School (South Carolina): Greer, South Carolina

See also
Blue Ridge School, St. George, Virginia
Blue Ridge School (North Carolina), Cashiers, North Carolina
Blue Ridge School District, Pennsylvania